Settlement risk is the risk that a counterparty (or intermediary agent) fails to deliver a security or its value in cash as per agreement when the security was traded after the other counterparty or counterparties have already delivered security or cash value as per the trade agreement.  The term covers factors incidental to the settlement process which may suspend or prevent a trade from completing, even though the parties themselves are in agreement, are acting in good faith, and otherwise competent to perform.

The term applies only to risks inherent to the settlement method of a particular transaction.  Broader risks of trading such as political risk or systemic risk may interrupt markets and prevent settlement, but these are not settlement risk per se.

One form of settlement risk is foreign exchange settlement risk or cross-currency settlement risk, sometimes called Herstatt risk after the German bank that made a famous example of the risk.  On 26 June 1974, the bank's license was withdrawn by German regulators at the end of the banking day (4:30pm local time) because of a lack of income and capital to cover liabilities that were due.  But some banks had undertaken foreign exchange transactions with Herstatt and had already paid Deutsche Mark to the bank during the day, believing they would receive US dollars later the same day in the US from Herstatt's US nostro. But after 3:30 pm in Germany and 10:30 am in New York, Herstatt stopped all dollar payments to counterparties, leaving the counterparties unable to collect their payment.

The closing of Drexel Burnham Lambert in 1990 did not cause similar problems because the Bank of England had set up a special scheme which ensured that payments were completed. Barings in 1995 resulted in minor losses for counterparties in the foreign exchange market because of a specific complexity in the ECU clearing system.

Mitigation

Settlement risk may be mitigated through various techniques, including:

 Delivery versus payment.
 Settlement through clearing houses.
 Settling foreign exchange via a special-purpose entity, such as the CLS Group.

External links 
 Understanding Derivatives: Markets and Infrastructure Federal Reserve Bank of Chicago, Financial Markets Group
 European Securities and Markets Authority
 Overview of Settlement Risks across Europe (26 countries)
 Bank for International Settlements: Committee on Payment and Settlement Systems Forum for central banks to monitor and analyse developments in domestic payment, settlement and clearing systems as well as in cross-border and multicurrency settlement schemes. Excellent publications and research showing various forms of settlement risk and mitigation strategies.

Securities (finance)
Financial risk
Settlement (finance)